Evosmos (Évosmos; before 1955: Neos Koukloutzas (Νέος Κουκλουτζάς, Néos Koukloutzás)) is a suburb of the Thessaloniki Urban Area and was a former municipality in the regional unit of Thessaloniki, Greece. Since the 2011 local government reform it is part of the municipality Kordelio-Evosmos, of which it is the seat and a municipal unit. Due to rapid development, the population has been growing fast. Most of the new development is taking place in the northern district of the municipality called Nea Politeia (New Town).

History
Evosmos' first dramatic increase in population occurred when refugees from Asia Minor settled in the area in the early 20th century. The settlement was originally a small village called in Turkish Harmanköy (Χαρμάνκιοϊ). At the Population exchange between Greece and Turkey in 1923, the Muslim Inhabitants (Turks, Pomaks, Muslim Romani people) went to Turkey. In 1953, Harmanköy became an independent community and was renamed Neos Koukloutzas (Νέος Κουκλουτζάς). Two years later it was renamed again to Evosmos, meaning a place that smells nice.

Life in the Municipality
Most cultural activity takes place around the municipality's main square. The square is surrounded by cafes, bars, the city hall, and the main church of the municipality.

The main shopping street, Megalou Alexandrou, is just to the north of the square. The cultural center and cinema are located on this street.

Religion

There are several orthodox churches in the municipality. Agios Athanasios was built in 1818 and is the oldest of the three. Evagelismos is the largest and is located by the square. The Church of the Three Hierarchs is the newest church and is located in the Nea Politeia district.

Sports
The Municipal Athletic Center of Evosmos (in Greek Δημοτικό Αθλητικό Κέντρο Ευόσμου) is located in Nea Politeia. It has indoor basketball and volleyball courts. The Center is used as temporary home by Iraklis Volley for their matches in CEV Champions League. It has also hosted the 2003 Juniors' World Basketball Championship's first round.

Agrotikos Asteras is the local football club that plays professionally in the B' Division - Super League 2. Other smaller clubs include Aias Evosmou, A. E. Evosmou, Ethnikos Evosmou and Makedon Evosmou, all of which play in the amateur leagues.

Several notable athletes have come out of Evosmos. Some of the better-known figures include Dinos Kouis and Georgios Firos who both started their careers at Agrotikos Asteras and went on to play for Aris Thessaloniki as well as the national team. Nikos Hatzivrettas is a notable basketball player who began his career at Aias Evosmou.

People
 Dinos Kouis, footballer
 Kyriakos Velopoulos, journalist, politician

References

External links
Website 
  

Populated places in Thessaloniki (regional unit)